Radomir Đalović (born 29 October 1982) is a Montenegrin professional football coach and a former player. He is an assistant coach with Croatian club Rijeka. In international competition, he represented Montenegro.

Club career

Early career
Born in Bijelo Polje, Đalović began his football career in hometown club FK Jedinstvo Bijelo Polje. He was soon scouted by Red Star Belgrade, who at the time being had just sold Perica Ognjenović to Real Madrid. Đalović, being a powerful and very athletic player compared to his teammates in Bijelo Polje, impressed the Belgrade side and signed for them, although never made a lasting impression with Red Star. After only a half season with the team, his fate was already sealed and he was transferred to FK Železnik. Later, after playing in Turkey with Kayseri Erciyesspor, Đalović had very successful spells with NK Zagreb and ambitious NK Rijeka. He was known for his speed, agility, and athletic finesse which allowed him to perform impressive bicycle kicks.

Sepahan
Đalović joined ambitious Iranian side Sepahan in the summer of 2012, which at the time was being coached by Zlatko Kranjčar who was already familiar with Đalović. Sepahan allegedly paid a sum equivalent to €600,000 for paying Amkar to have Đalović come to Iran. Although Đalović impressed in the 2013 AFC Champions League group stage by scoring against Al Nasr SC (Dubai) and Al-Ahli (Jeddah), Sepahan did not make it through Group C that season.

Shanghai Shenxin
In February 2014, Đalović transferred to Chinese Super League side Shanghai Shenxin.

OFK Titograd
On 28 June 2019 OFK Titograd announced, that they had signed Đalović.

International career
He made his debut for Montenegro in an October 2007 friendly match against Estonia and has earned a total of 26 caps (22 official), scoring 7 goals, which places him sixth on Montenegro's all-time top scorer list. His final international was a November 2011 European Championship qualification match against the Czech Republic. He retired on 18 February 2012 for personal reasons.

Career statistics

Honours
Red Star Belgrade
First League of FR Yugoslavia: 2000–01

Sepahan
Hazfi Cup: 2012–13

Budućnost Podgorica
Montenegrin First League: 2016–17

References

External links
 
 Radomir Đalović profile at Nogometni Magazin 

1982 births
Living people
People from Bijelo Polje
Association football forwards
Serbia and Montenegro footballers
Serbia and Montenegro under-21 international footballers
Montenegrin footballers
Montenegro international footballers
FK Jedinstvo Bijelo Polje players
Red Star Belgrade footballers
FK Železnik players
NK Zagreb players
Arminia Bielefeld players
Kayseri Erciyesspor footballers
HNK Rijeka players
FC Rapid București players
FC Amkar Perm players
Sepahan S.C. footballers
Shanghai Shenxin F.C. players
Radomir Đalovic
Radomir Đalovic
FK Budućnost Podgorica players
FK Rudar Pljevlja players
OFK Titograd players
OFK Grbalj players
Second League of Serbia and Montenegro players
First League of Serbia and Montenegro players
Croatian Football League players
Bundesliga players
Süper Lig players
Liga I players
Russian Premier League players
Persian Gulf Pro League players
Chinese Super League players
Radomir Đalovic
Radomir Đalovic
Montenegrin First League players
Serbia and Montenegro expatriate  footballers
Expatriate footballers in Croatia
Serbia and Montenegro expatriate sportspeople in Croatia
Expatriate footballers in Germany
Serbia and Montenegro expatriate sportspeople in Germany
Montenegrin expatriate footballers
Expatriate footballers in Turkey
Montenegrin expatriate sportspeople in Turkey
Montenegrin expatriate sportspeople in Croatia
Expatriate footballers in Romania
Montenegrin expatriate sportspeople in Romania
Expatriate footballers in Russia
Montenegrin expatriate sportspeople in Russia
Expatriate footballers in Iran
Montenegrin expatriate sportspeople in Iran
Expatriate footballers in China
Montenegrin expatriate sportspeople in China
Expatriate footballers in Thailand
Montenegrin expatriate sportspeople in Thailand